L.N.Tallur is an Indian born International visual artist.

He divides his time between India and South Korea.  He was the winner of the 2012 Škoda prize for Indian contemporary art

Education 

1992–96, B.F.A.in Painting, Chamarajendra Academy of Visual Arts (CAVA), Mysore University, India

1997–98, M.F.A. in Museology, Maharaja Sayajirao University of Baroda, Gujarat, India

2001–02, M.A.in Contemporary Fine art Practice, Leeds Metropolitan University, Leeds, U.K.

Solo exhibitions 

2023 'Vidi Vini Vici' Linden Museum, Stuttgart, Germany. (acquisition exhibition upcoming).

2022 'Chirag-e-AI' Museum of Art & Photography (MAP), Bengaluru, India.

2019 'Interference Fringe' Curator;Gary Garrido Schneider, GFS, Hamilton, NJ, USA.

2018 'Coinage' Permanent Public sculpture at UPM circle Manipal, India.

2017 Smoke Out, Chemould Prescott road, Mumbai, India *

2015 The Threshold, Arario Gallery, Seoul, South Korea

2014 UKAI (Cormorant Fish Hunting) Nature Morte, New Delhi

2013 SCAD Museum Of Art, Georgia

2013 New Yorked, Jack Shainman Gallery, New York, USA

2012 Montessori: Lessons in Economics, Nature Morte, Berlin, Germany

2012 "Pass word" Nature Morte, New Delhi

2011 Quintessential, Dr. Bhau Daji Lad Mumbai City Museum, India

2011 Chromatophobia -The fear of Money (part-2) Nature Morte, New Delhi

2011 Chromatophobia -The fear of Money (part-1) Arario Gallery, South Korea

2010 Chromatophobia -The fear of Money (part-1) Arario Gallery, Beijing China

2009 PLACEBO, Chemould Prescott road, Mumbai, India

2008 Antimatter, Arario New York, New York

2007 Bon Appetite, Arario Seoul, Korea

2000 Past Modern Interactive Art Objects, Bose Pacia Modern, Soho, New York

1999 Past Modern Interactive Art Objects, Gallery Chemould, Mumbai, India

Awards 

2012 The SKODA Prize, Delhi, India

2003 Sanskriti Award, Sanskriti Foundation, Delhi, India

2001 Commonwealth Scholarship, to study at LMU, Leeds, U.K.

1999 Emerging Artist award, Bose Pacia Modern, Soho, New York, U.S.

1997 Inlaks Fine Art Award, Inlaks Foundation, Delhi.

1996 National Scholarship, Ministry of HRD, Govt. of India

1995 Karnataka Lalitkala Akademi Scholarship, to study at MSU, Baroda

Essays

The Object as Label
by Pramod Kumar KG

Sculptures in Quotation Marks
by Peter Nagy

Smoking Out
by By Naman P.Ahuja

The Cases of L. N. Tallur
by By Dr. Holiy Shaffer

The Playful Cynicism of Tallur L.N.
By Faye Hirsch

When objects of fact become objects of concern...The Alchemy of L N Tallur.
By Dr. Parul Dave Mukherji

Creator, Preserver, Iconoclast
By Girish Shahane

The Acumenical Pursuits of Mr. L.N. Tallur
by Peter Nagy

Tallur L. N.’s Antimatter: International Vernaculars and Throwaway Epiphanies: the recent work of Tallur L. N.
By Chaitanya Sambrani

Tallur L.N.: Material as Metaphor
by Joao Ribas

Publication

Chirag-e-AI - Published by Museum of Art & Photography (MAP), Bengaluru, a division of the Art & Photography Foundation (APF)

THRESHOLD/SMOKE OUT - Published by
Chemould Prescott Road.
and Arario Gallery

Tallur L.N. -An introductory Catalogue in Kannada edited by Rajarama Tallur. - Published in conjunction with the unveiling of the public sculpture "Coinage"
at Udupi, in February, 2018

Chromatophobia - The Fear of Money - Publisher Arario Gallery, www.arariogallery.com, Nature Morte, www.naturemorte.com

Placebo - This Catalogue was published in conjunction with
Placebo:Tallur L.N. at Chemould Prescott Road ,Mumbai
Antimatter ;Tallur L.N. at Arario New York in 2009

Bon Appetite - This book was Published on the occasion of the exhibition " Bon Appetite" at Arario Seoul ,Korea. 2007
Arario Seoul

Past Modern - Interactive Art Objects - 1999 - Published by Gallery Chemould -Jehangir Art Gallery ,1st Floor
M.G.Road-Bombay 400023

Press/Recognition 

L.N. Tallur Wins India’s Skoda Prize - Wall Street Journal

Indian-Korean artist Tallur LN speaks about Indian art scene - India Today

External links
 L.N. Tallur website
 Saatchi gallery website
 Jackshainman gallery website 
 Nature Morte website
 Chemould gallery

References

Artists from Bangalore